The name Binang was used for three tropical cyclones by the Philippine Atmospheric, Geophysical and Astronomical Services Administration (PAGASA) in the Western Pacific Ocean.

 Typhoon Faye (1965) (T6532, 39W, Binang) – a strong typhoon which paralleled the coasts of Philippines and Japan but did not impact land.
 Tropical Storm Jeff (1981) (T8127, 27W, Binang) – a weak tropical storm that stayed at sea.
 Tropical Depression Binang (1993) – a short-lived tropical disturbance only recognized by PAGASA.

Pacific typhoon set index articles